Pinoy True Stories is a collective title of five docu-news magazine programs broadcast by ABS-CBN. The network's news journalists will tackle real-life accounts of Filipinos and help in solving problems that affect the communities and families nationwide. The five programs of Pinoy True Stories currently airs every Mondays to Saturdays on ABS-CBN, with an encore telecast on Jeepney TV. It also airs worldwide via TFC.

Pinoy True Stories premiered on December 3, 2012, each of the five programs were previously aired every weekday afternoons on the Kapamilya Gold afternoon block. On December 7, 2015, all the five programs of Pinoy True Stories has been moved to late weeknights.

From May 5, 2020, the five programs of Pinoy True Stories has been temporarily suspended airings due to the temporary closure of ABS-CBN because of the cease and desist order of the National Telecommunications Commission (NTC), following the expiration of the network's 25-year franchise granted in 1995.

Hosts
Current hosts
 Dyan Castillejo (for Sports U)
 Julius Babao (for Mission Possible; formerly for Bistado)
 Karen Davila (for My Puhunan; formerly for Engkwentro and 3-in-1)
Jeff Canoy (for #NoFilter; formerly for Red Alert)
 Chiara Zambrano (for #NoFilter)
 Abner Mercado (for #NoFilter)
 Raphael Bosano (for #NoFilter)
 Kori Quintos (for #NoFilter)
 Jacque Manabat (for #NoFilter)
 Jeck Batallones (for #NoFilter)
 Kevin Manalo (for #NoFilter)
 Sherrie Ann Torres (for #NoFilter)

Former hosts
 Doris Bigornia (for Mutya ng Masa)
 Maan Macapagal (for Saklolo)
 Dominic Almelor (for Saklolo)
 K Brosas (for 3-in-1)
 Atty. Claire Castro (for 3-in-1)
 Atom Araullo (for Red Alert; formerly for Hiwaga and RealiTV)
 Anthony Taberna (for TNT: Tapatan ni Tunying; formerly for Demandahan)

Final programs

Mission Possible
In Mission Possible, Julius Babao seeks out the inspirational stories of ordinary Filipino people with love, and how their dreams will turn into possible. The segment currently airs every Saturdays, with replays on Monday mornings and late nights.
It premiered on February 9, 2015 replacing Bistado.

My Puhunan
In My Puhunan (My Investment, stylized as my PUHUNAN), Karen Davila talks about various types of business and employees. The segment currently airs every Saturdays, with replay on Tuesday late nights and on Thursday mornings. 
It premiered on July 17, 2013 replacing Saklolo it ended on February 4, 2015 and returned on July 7, 2015.

#NoFilter
#NoFilter talks about the daily life of every Filipino individual through a point-of-view by a documentarist. The segment airs every Wednesdays with a replay every Friday mornings.
It premiered on May 1, 2019 replacing Red Alert.

Sports U
Sports U is a sequel to the long-running Sports Unlimited. Dyan Castillejo will profile the lives of Filipino athletes from various sports. The segment airs every Thursdays.
It premiered on February 12, 2015 replacing the Thursday timeslot of TNT: Tapatan ni Tunying.

Local Legends
Local Legends talks about the unique heritages of local foods, arts, musics, and cultural icons. The segment airs every Fridays with a replay every Tuesday mornings.
It premiered on May 3, 2019 replacing TNT: Tapatan ni Tunying.

Previous programs

Bistado
In Bistado (Busted), Julius Babao opens the action-packed week to uncover cases of abuse, neglect or cruelty, as well as corrupt practices in the government and the various modus operandi of criminals. The segment formerly aired every Monday.
It premiered on December 3, 2012 and ended on February 2, 2015.

Engkwentro
In Engkwentro (Encounter), Karen Davila mediates between clashing parties in relationships, families and neighborhoods to help them resolve their conflicts and reach an agreement. The segment formerly aired every Tuesday.
It premiered on December 4, 2012 and ended on July 9, 2013.

Saklolo
In Saklolo (Help!), news reporters Maan Macapagal and Dominic Almelor lend a hand to people stuck in accidents, calamity or the cycle of maltreatment. The segment formerly aired every Wednesday.
It premiered on December 5, 2012 and ended on July 10, 2013.

Demandahan
In Demandahan (Accuse), Anthony Taberna provides public legal help and advice to help solve the most problematic disputes in court. The segment formerly aired every Thursday.
It premiered on December 6, 2012 and ended on July 11, 2013.

Hiwaga
In Hiwaga (Mystery), Atom Araullo explores mysterious phenomena as he unmasks the truth behind supernatural occurrences. The segment formerly aired every Friday.
It premiered on December 7, 2012 and ended on March 14, 2014.

Mutya ng Masa
In Mutya ng Masa (Pearl of People), Doris Bigornia talks about simple interests, problems and difficulties, and easy sources of happiness that every normal Filipino encounters every day. The segment formerly aired every Tuesday.
It premiered on July 16, 2013 replacing Engkwentro and ended on February 3, 2015.

3-in-1
In the live talk show 3 in 1, Karen Davila, K Brosas and Atty. Claire Castro will discuss a wide variety of topics from news to general interest stories. The segment formerly aired every Tuesday.
It premiered on February 10, 2015 replacing Mutya ng Masa and ended on June 30, 2015.

RealiTV
In RealiTV, Atom Araullo will feature death-defying home videos from various parts of the world. The segment formerly aired every Wednesday.
It premiered on February 11, 2015 replacing My Puhunan and ended on July 1, 2015.

Red Alert
In Red Alert (stylized as REDALERT), Atom Araullo/Jeff Canoy provides tips on how to survive in life-threatening situations such as crimes, accidents, and natural disasters. The segment formerly aired every Friday, and later Wednesday. Araullo left the program (after he transferred to GMA Network) and was replaced by Jeff Canoy onwards.
It premiered on March 21, 2014 replacing Hiwaga and ended on February 6, 2015. It returned on July 8, 2015.

TNT: Tapatan ni Tunying
In Tapatan ni Tunying (One-on-One with Tunying), Anthony Taberna interviews personalities and politicians. The segment formerly aired every Thursday, and later Friday.
It premiered on July 18, 2013 replacing Demandahan.

See also
List of programs broadcast by ABS-CBN

References

ABS-CBN original programming
ABS-CBN News and Current Affairs shows
Philippine reality television series
Philippine documentary television series
2012 Philippine television series debuts
2020 Philippine television series endings
2020s Philippine television series
Filipino-language television shows